Voodoo Violince is the first studio album by violinist Mark Wood, released in 1991 through Guitar Recordings.

Critical reception

Roch Parisien at AllMusic gave Voodoo Violince three stars out of five, recommending it to open-minded fans of guitarists Joe Satriani and Steve Vai who might be looking for something different. He said that "Wood's arsenal of custom-made electric violins (including a six- and nine-string double-neck, and a Flying V) sounds much like a Star Trek phaser set to overload and on the verge of exploding." Parisien went on to further describe Wood's tone, saying "The high-pitched squeal can have an unearthly effect, full of feedback and vibrato but with the texture and range of a keyboard."

Track listing

Personnel

Mark Wood – violin, keyboard, piano, strings, production
Laura Kaye – vocals
George Green – vocals
Sylvestor Anthony Lewis III – vocals
Dave Lewitt – drums, percussion
Gerald Veasley – bass
Gregor Kitzis – strings
Denise Rude – strings
Liz Lim – strings
Eric Freelander – strings
Rozz Morehead – background vocals
Barbara Murray – background vocals
Suze Albright – background vocals
Lynette Washington – background vocals
Shawn Green – engineering
Paul Orofino – engineering, production
Tom Schizzano – engineering
John Stix – production

References

1991 debut albums